David Teniers the Elder (158229 July 1649), Flemish painter, was born at Antwerp.

Biography

Having received his first training in the painter's art from his brother Juliaen, he studied under Rubens in Antwerp, and subsequently under Elsheimer in Rome; he became a member of the Antwerp guild of painters in 1606.

Though his ambition led him at times to try his skill in large religious, historical and mythological compositions, his claim to fame depends chiefly on his landscapes and paintings of peasants carousing, of kermesse scenes and the like, which are marked by a healthy sense of humour, and which are not infrequently confused with the early works of his son David.

There is a large painting by the elder Teniers at St. Paul's church in Antwerp, representing the Works of Charity. At the Vienna Gallery are four landscapes painted by Teniers under the influence of Elsheimer, and four small mythological subjects, among them Vertumnus and Pomona, and Juno, Jupiter and Io. The National Gallery has a characteristic scene of village life, Playing at Bowls, a Conversation of three men and a woman, and a large Rocky Landscape. Other examples of his work are to be found at the galleries of St Petersburg, Madrid, Brussels, Munich, Dresden and Berlin (The Temptation of St Anthony).

Teniers also achieved success as a picture dealer, and is known to have attended the fair of St Germain in Paris in 1635, with a large number of paintings by himself and by his four sons. He died at Antwerp in 1649.

See also
David Teniers the Younger
David Teniers III

References

1582 births
1649 deaths
Landscape artists
Flemish Baroque painters
Painters from Antwerp